Tetramicra may refer to:
 Tetramicra (plant), a genus of flowering plants in the family Orchidaceae
 Tetramicra (microsporidian), a fungus genus in the division Microsporidia